Deadline is a 1996 strategy video game developed by Millennium Interactive and published by Vic Tokai.

Gameplay 
Deadline is a real-time tactics game, in which the player navigates a squad of soldiers through discrete missions. The game combines real-time gameplay with pre-planning stages. Its gameplay style has been compared to that of Jagged Alliance and X-COM: UFO Defense.

Reception 

William R. Trotter of PC Gamer US was unimpressed with Deadline. He concluded, "Despite its interesting concept, Deadline is dead on arrival." Computer Game Reviews critic was significantly more positive, calling the gameplay "great fun" and arguing that "strategy and action game fans should take a good look at Deadline."

References

External links 

1996 video games
DOS games
DOS-only games
Real-time strategy video games
Strategy video games
Real-time tactics video games
Video games developed in the United Kingdom
Video games with isometric graphics